The Chinese Culture University (CCU) is a private Taiwanese university located in Yangmingshan in Shilin District, Taipei, Taiwan. CCU was established in 1962 and is one of the largest universities in Taiwan with an enrollment of about 32,000 students. Satellite campuses are located in the Jianguo, Ximending, and Zhongxiao East Road areas of Taipei City. CCU has a vast collaboration and network with top universities around the world.

The school was founded as Far East University in 1962 by Chang Chi-yun, and renamed College of Chinese Culture by President Chiang Kai-shek in 1963. It became Chinese Culture University in 1980. CCU is organized into twelve academic colleges: Liberal Arts, Foreign Language and Literature, Social Sciences, Science, Engineering, Business Administration, Journalism and Communications, Arts,  Environmental Design, Law, Agriculture, and Education.

History
Chinese Culture University has been reorganized many times.  The Ministry of Education granted the University permission to establish studies in philosophy, Chinese, Eastern languages, English, French, German, history, geography, news, art, music, drama, physical education, domestic science, and architecture.

Academics

CCU has 12 colleges: Agriculture, Arts, Business Administration, Education, Engineering, Environmental Design, Foreign Languages, Journalism and Mass Communications, Law, Liberal Arts, Science, and Social Sciences. The Department of Tourism Management ranks in the top three among universities in Mainland China, Hong Kong and Taiwan. CCU first appeared and ranked 401-450 in the QS 2022 Asian Universities Ranking.

Location
The main campus is located on Yang Ming Mountain, overlooks the Tienmu District, and is about a 45-minute drive from Taipei Main Station. The area is known for its extensive hiking trails and hot springs. The university is located just off of the main road that winds up the mountain where a 24-hour Wellcome Supermarket, 7-11, Starbucks, Mos Burger, and McDonald's can be found. Many of the students rent apartments in this small village area and the city buses have stops along the main road.

The Hwa Kang Museum

Established in 1971, the university museum, also called the Hwa Kang Museum, is the first comprehensive museum of its kind in Taiwan. Its permanent collection consists of Chinese ceramics from the many centuries, modern Chinese paintings and calligraphic works, Chinese folk arts and woodblock prints. Some highlights of the collection include pieces by Wang Yangming, Wu Changshuo, Woo Tsin-hang, Yu Youren, Puru, Chang Dai-chien, and Li Meishu.

Transportation
The relatively inconvenient and isolated location of CCU's main campus has presented students and staff with transportation problems. While the university operates a number of school buses to transport faculty, staff and students up and down the mountain every day, many students chose to ride scooters up to the main campus. This has resulted in a high number of student injuries and fatalities each semester. Public buses, the R5 and 260, also operate between the main campus and downtown Taipei. These buses also make stops at Jiantan and Shilin MRT train stations. Taxi service can be found on the main campus with taxis waiting for students and teachers in front of the university sports centre during the daytime hours.

Facilities
CCU has four campuses in Taipei City. The main campus is located on Yang Ming Mountain and three other smaller campuses are located in Jianguo, Ximending, and Zhongxiao East Road in downtown Taipei. The Jianguo campus is the location of the Mandarin Training Centre, while the Zhongxiao East Road campus is the location of the International Language Institute. The Ximending campus offers a variety of both credit and non-credit courses in addition to being an extension campus for the College of Law.

Aboriginal students
There is a large aboriginal society at CCU with many students from all over Taiwan participating in activities that celebrate their aboriginal cultures.

Martial arts
CCU is well known in Taiwan for the martial arts programs offered at the Yang Ming Shan campus. The CCU Judo team is internationally competitive and a number of members have won their division in both national and international tournaments. The CCU Martial Arts Department also offers courses in Japanese ju jitsu, aikido and kung fu.

People

Notable faculty
 Chang Chin-lan - first female justice of the Supreme Court of the Republic of China.
 Ch'ien Mu - Chinese historian, educator, philosopher and Confucian considered one of the greatest historians and philosophers in 20th-century China.
 Hu Lancheng - Chinese writer and editor.
 Li Meishu - Artist and builder of Zushi Temple.
 Mou Zongsan - Chinese New Confucian philosopher.
 Nan Huai-Chin - Professor of Chan Buddhism.
 Thomas Liao, founding director of the graduate school of chemical engineering.
 Song Xi - History Professor
 Sanmao - Associate Professor in the Chinese Language Department.
 Sheng-yen - Founder of the Dharma Drum Mountain.
 John Ching Hsiung Wu - Chinese poet, lawyer, and writer.

Notable alumni
 Aaron Yan, pop singer, actor, from the Fahrenheit boyband (b. 1985)
 Hsu Tain-tsair, Mayor of Tainan City (2001-2010)
 Hung Hsiu-chu, Chairperson of Kuomintang (2016-2017)
 Iwan Nawi, Deputy Minister of Council of Indigenous Peoples
 Winnie Hsin, pop singer (b. 1962)
 Yang Cheng-wu, Magistrate-elect of Kinmen County
 Li Ang, acclaimed Taiwanese feminist writer and author of The Butcher's Wife (b. 1952)
 Tsai Ming-Liang, Golden Lion award-winning Taiwanese film director
 Huang Chih-hsiung, Olympic medalist in Taekwondo
 Jimmy Liao, Taiwanese illustrator and picture book writer
 Frankie Kao, singer
 Kingone Wang, actor and singer
 Jenny Tseng, Macau-born singer
 Richie Ren, singer and actor
 Wang Hsing-ching
 Tsao Chi-hung, Magistrate of Pingtung County (2005–2014)
 Pan Shih-wei, Minister of Ministry of Labor (2014)
 Liu Cheng-hung, Magistrate of Miaoli County (2005–2014)
 Hsu Ming-tsai, Mayor of Hsinchu City (2009–2014)
 Lin Yu-chang, Mayor of Keelung City
 Wei Li Chin, Chief Investment Officer of Densu
 Wu Tien-chang, artist

Gallery

See also
 List of universities in Taiwan
 Chinese Culture University Mandarin Learning Center
 Chinese Encyclopedia
 U12 Consortium

References

External links 

French Department Homepage

 
1962 establishments in Taiwan
Educational institutions established in 1962
Universities and colleges in Taiwan
Universities and colleges in Taipei
Comprehensive universities in Taiwan